Events from the year 1982 in Scotland.

Incumbents 

 Secretary of State for Scotland and Keeper of the Great Seal – George Younger

Law officers 
 Lord Advocate – Lord Mackay of Clashfern
 Solicitor General for Scotland – Nicholas Fairbairn; then Peter Fraser

Judiciary 
 Lord President of the Court of Session and Lord Justice General – Lord Emslie
 Lord Justice Clerk – Lord Wheatley
 Chairman of the Scottish Land Court – Lord Elliott

Events 
 10 January – The lowest ever Scottish and UK temperature of -27.2 °C is recorded at Braemar, in Aberdeenshire. This equals the record set in the same place in 1895, and the record will be equalled again at Altnaharra in 1995.
 February – first production from the Fulmar Oil Field in the North Sea.
 25 March – Roy Jenkins wins the Glasgow Hillhead by-election for the Social Democratic Party.
 6 May – 1982 Scottish regional elections, resulting in Labour winning the largest number of local councillors in the regions, followed by the Conservatives.
 31 May–1 June – Pope John Paul II's visit to the United Kingdom embraces Edinburgh and Glasgow.
 12 June – Faslane Peace Camp established.
 24 June – Coatbridge and Airdrie by-election: Tom Clarke retains the seat for Labour.
 19 July – Kessock Bridge opened over the Beauly Firth.
 2 December – Glasgow Queen's Park by-election: Helen McElhone retains the seat for Labour previously held by her husband despite a swing of 9.4% to the Scottish National Party.
 The Carron Company ironworks of 1759 at Falkirk goes into receivership.
 First discovery on the Isle of Skye of fossilized dinosaur footprints, at Lealt.

Births 
 5 January – Darren Mackie, footballer
 15 May – Douglas Simpson, field hockey forward
 21 October – David Mansouri, field hockey defender
 14 November – Stephen Hughes, footballer
 6 December – Susie Wolff, racing driver
 12 December – Louise Carroll, field hockey defender

Deaths 
 4 February
 Alex Harvey, glam rock musician (born 1935)
 Anne Gillespie Shaw, engineer and businesswoman (born 1904)
 20 February – Isobel Wylie Hutchison, explorer (born 1889)
 1 May in Provo, Utah – William Primrose, Scottish-born violist (born 1904)
 1 July – Alexander Reid, playwright (born 1914)
 20 October – Jimmy McGrory, footballer (born 1904)

The arts
 Soft rock band Wet Wet Wet forms in Clydebank as "Vortex Motion".

See also 
 1982 in Northern Ireland

References 

 
Scotland
Years of the 20th century in Scotland
1980s in Scotland